On Melissus, Xenophanes, and Gorgias is a short work falsely attributed to Aristotle. The work was likely written during the 1st century CE or later by a member of the peripatetic school.

Modern Criticism 

Jaap Mansfeld argures that the work's style of argumentation may have been influenced by the Pyrrhonist modes of Agrippa the Skeptic.

See also 
 Melissus
 Xenophanes
 Gorgias

Notes

References

 Guthrie, W. K. C. (1962). A History of Greek Philosophy Volume I: The Earlier Presocratics and the Pythagoreans. Cambridge University Press.

External links
 
 (Pseudo)-Aristotle, On Melissus, Xenophanes, and Gorgias (Greek text and English translation)
 Aristotle, Minor Works
__notoc__

Pseudoaristotelian works